Nicolaus A. Huber (born 15 December 1939) is a German composer.

Education
Huber was born in Passau. From 1958 to 1962 he studied music education at the Hochschule für Musik und Theater München and subsequently composition with Franz Xaver Lehner and Günter Bialas. He pursued his education further with Josef Anton Riedl, Karlheinz Stockhausen and, above all, with Luigi Nono. From 1974 until his retirement in 2003 Huber was Professor of Composition at the Folkwang Hochschule in Essen.

Style and influences
Riedl and Schnebel inspired Huber's vocal and linguistic experiments. Riedl in particular encouraged Huber's radical tendencies. His treatment of musical material was most strongly formed by his contact with Stockhausen, while Nono inspired in him an acute historical and political (Marxist) awareness, particularly evident in his second compositional phase, beginning around 1969.  Huber took part in Stockhausen's composition project Ensemble at the 1967 Darmstädter Ferienkurse, an experience that gave him an appreciation of the potential for improvisation—a factor that marks not only his compositions for conventional forces, but also his mixed- and multi-media experiments. Stockhausen's influence can also be seen in Huber's exploitation of space and the incorporation of extraneous elements, such as vocal utterances in instrumental music, as a means of heightening expression. His period of study with Luigi Nono in 1967–68 was even more influential on Huber. Nono encouraged Huber to seek a more thorough-going means of eradicating tonality, through a study of psychology in order better to understand human responses.

Selected compositions
 Traummechanik for percussion and piano (1967)
 von ... bis ... for viola, harmonium, piano and percussion (1968)
 Aion for four-track tape and odors (1968/72)
 Harakiri for small orchestra and tape (1971)
 Gespenster for large orchestra, singer/speaker, and tape, on texts by Bertolt Brecht and Peter Maiwald (1976)
 Darabukka for piano (1976)
 dasselbe ist nicht dasselbe for snare drum (1978)
 Morgenlied for large orchestra (1980)
 Vor und zurück for oboe (1981)
 Six Bagatelles for chamber ensemble and tape (1981)
 Aus Schmerz und Trauer for alto saxophone or clarinet in B (or Bassett horn) (1982)
 Trio mit Stabpandeira for viola, cello and double bass (1983)
 Demijour for oboe, violoncello, and piano (1985/86)
 Doubles, mit einem beweglichen Ton for string quartet (1987)
 Go Ahead. Musik für Orchester mit Shrugs (1988)
 Three Pieces for orchestra with breather/singer and obligato piano (1990/91)
 First play Mozart for solo flute (1993)
 Als eine Aussicht weit... for flute, viola and harp (1996)
 Covered with Music for soprano, flute, accordion, percussion, and contrabass (1997)
 ACH, DAS ERHABENE...(G. Benn) betäubte fragmente for two interlaced choirs of 36 voices (1999)
 Der entkommene Orpheus for four guitars (2001)
 O dieses Lichts! (G. Benn) for flute, violoncello, and piano (2002)
 Werden Fische je das Wasser leid? (Ch. Bukowski) Music with Neglect-Syndrome for soprano and instrumentalists (2003)
 EN for viola solo (2007)

Political revues
 Don Quichotte und Sancho Pansa in den Irrungen und Wirrungen der westlichen Demokratie (1976, Düsseldorf)
 Hanna und Paul oder: Der Sozialismus kommt selten allein (1977, Düsseldorf)
 Faust, der Tragödie unbekannter Teil (1978/79, Bochum)
 Staatszirkus (1980, Nürnberg)

Prizes
 Culture Prize for Music of the Stadt München (1969)
 Darmstadt Composition Prize (1970)
 Supporting Prize in Music from the Berlin Academy of Arts (1988)

Writings
 2000. Nicolaus A. Huber. Durchleuchtungen. Texte zur Musik 1964-1999, ed. by Josef Häusler. Wiesbaden: Breitkopf & Härtel. .
 2002."'Die Zeit ist buchstabengenau und allbarmherzig'. Zu Hölderlin in meinen Kompositionen", Dissonanz, 76:4–13; 77:4–15.
 2005. "Pour les Enfants du paradis. Kurze Charakterstücke für KlavierPlus" (2003) in: Hören und Sehen – Musik audiovisuell. Wahrnehmung im Wandel. Produktion—Rezeption—Analyse—Vermittlung. Veröffentlichungen des Instituts für Neue Musik und Musikerziehung 45, pp. 57–61. Mainz: Schott.
 2006. "Über einige Beziehungen zu Bach (und Friedrich Hölderlin)". MusikTexte, no. 108 (February).

References

Further reading
 Amzoll, Stefan. 2006. "Über Geschichte und kritisches Komponieren bei Nicolaus A. Huber". MusikTexte, no. 108 (February).
 Birkenkötter, Jörg. 2006. "Neue harmonische Prozeßverläufe in Pour les Enfants du paradis von Nicolaus A. Huber". MusikTexte, no. 108 (February).
 Blomann, Karl-Heinz, and Frank Sielecki. 1997. "Gespräch mit Nicolaus A. Huber". In Hören: Eine vernachlässigte Kunst?, edited by Karl-Heinz Blomann and Frank Sielecki, 75–93. Hofheim: Wolke. .
 Blumenthaler, Volker. 2006. "Der Weg ist steinig. Zu „Offenes Fragment“ von Nicolaus A. Huber". MusikTexte, no. 108 (February).
 Brauss, Martin. 2004. "'Elfenbeinturm mit Schließscharten': Anmerkungen zu Nocturnes von Nicolaus A. Huber". In Tacet, non tacet: Zur Rhetorik des Schweigens—Festschrift für Peter Becker zum 70. Geburtstag, edited by Charlotte Seither, 307-311. Saarbrücken: Pfau-Verlag. .
 Domann, Andreas. 2005. "'Wo bleibt das Negative?' Zur musikalischen Ästhetik Helmut Lachenmanns, Nicolaus A. Hubers und Mathias Spahlingers". Archiv für Musikwissenschaft 62, no. 3: 177–91.
 Ehrler, Hanno. 2006. "Zu einigen jüngeren Kompositionen von Nicolaus A. Huber". MusikTexte, no. 108 (February).
 Hiekel, Jörn Peter. 2006. "Das Vertraute und das Verstörende. Zu Nicolaus A. Hubers Komponieren". MusikTexte, no. 108 (February).
 Hiekl, Jörn Peter. 2008. "'Aufrührerisch mit kleinsten Mitteln': Aspekte des Widerständigen bei Luigi Nono, John Cage und Nicolaus A. Huber". Neue Zeitschrift für Musik 169, no. 2 (March–April): 32–37.
 Koch, Sven-Ingo. 2006. "Nicolaus A. Huber: Zwischen Strenge und Offenheit". MusikTexte, no. 108 (February).
 Lachenmann, Helmut. 1987. "Magier und Chirurg: Über Nicolaus A. Huber". MusikTexte, no. 20 (July–August). Reprinted, as "Über Nicolaus A. Huber", in Lachenmann, Musik als existentielle Erfahrung: Schriften 1966–1995, edited by Josef Häusler, 284–86. Wiesbaden: Breitkopf & Härtel; Frankfurt am Main: Insel-Verlag, 1996. ; .
 Nimczik, Ortwin. 2004. "Konzeptionelle Rhythmuskomposition: Vor und zurück für Oboe (1981) von Nicolaus A. Huber". In Neue Musik vermitteln: Analysen—Interpretation—Unterricht, edited by Hans Bässler, Ortwin Nimczik, and Peter W. Schatt. Schott Musikpädagogik. Mainz: Schott. .
 Nimczik, Ortwin. 2005. "Haltung ist wieder nötig!" Neue Zeitschrift für Musik 166, no. 3 (May–June): 40–43.
 Nonnenmann, Rainer, and Nicolaus A. Huber. 2005. "Die Sackgasse als Ausweg: Kritisches Komponieren—ein historisches Phänomen?" Musik & Ästhetik 9, no. 36 (October) 37–60.
 Oehlschlägel, Reinhard. 1983. "Nicolaus A. Huber im Gespräch". MusikTexte, no. 2 (December).
 Oehlschlägel, Reinhard. 2006. "Gespenster von Nicolaus A. Huber". MusikTexte, no. 108 (February).
 Rüdiger, Wolfgang. 2001. "Leuchtkräftige Durchleuchtungen: Nicolaus A. Hubers Texte zur Musik". Musik & Ästhetik 5, no. 17 (January): 105–109.
 Schwer, Cornelius. 2002. "Ajouter de nouvelles œuvres aux anciennes, cela a-t-il encore un sens? L'art, c'est fini? / Hat es noch Sinn, den bestehenden Werken neue hinzuzufügen? Ist die Kunst am Ende?" Dissonance/Dissonanz, no. 78 (December): 22–27.
 Schwer, Cornelius. 2003. "Nicolaus A. Huber: An Hölderlins Umnachtung". Musik & Ästhetik 7, no. 25 (January): 60–70. Reprinted in Contemporary Music Review 27, no. 6 (December 2008): Music of Nicolaus A. Huber and Mathias Spahlinger: 643–53.
 Schwehr, Cornelius. 2006. "Beobachtungen zu Don't Fence Me In von Nicolaus A. Huber". MusikTexte, no. 108 (February).
 Seidl, Hannes. 2006. "Einbrüche der Popkultur in der Musik von Nicolaus A. Huber seit 1990". MusikTexte, no. 108 (February). English translation as "The Height of the Breadth: Pop Culture Infiltrations in the Music of Nicolaus A. Huber", trans. Philipp Blume. Contemporary Music Review 27, no. 6 (December 2008): Music of Nicolaus A. Huber and Mathias Spahlinger: 655–64.
 Spahlinger, Mathias. 1983. "6 Bagatellen von Nicolaus A. Huber". MusikTexte, no. 2 (December).
 Spahlinger, Mathias. 2006. "Sphärenmusik von Nicolaus A. Huber". MusikTexte, no. 108 (February).
 Strässle, Thomas. 2001. "'Tout le sens de la claire image vit comme un tableau...': Le trio pour flûte, alto et harpe de Nicolaus A. Huber d'après Hölderlin / 'Der Ganze Sinn des hellen Bildes lebet als wie ein Bild...': Zu Nicolaus A. Hubers Hölderlin-Trio für Flöte, Viola und Harfe". Dissonance/Dissonanz, no. 70 (August): 14–19.
Torra-Mattenklott, Caroline. 2001. "'Me voici maintenant plein d'adieux': La tonalité dans An Hölderlins Umnachtung, pièce pour ensemble de Nicolaus A. Huber (1992) / 'Ich bin jetzt voll abschieds': Tonalität in Nicolaus A. Hubers Ensemblestück An Hölderlins Umnachtung (1992)". Dissonance/Dissonanz, no. 70 (August): 4–13.

20th-century classical composers
21st-century classical composers
German classical composers
University of Music and Performing Arts Munich alumni
Living people
1939 births
People from Passau
Pupils of Karlheinz Stockhausen
Members of the Academy of Arts, Berlin
German male classical composers
20th-century German composers
21st-century German composers
20th-century German male musicians
21st-century German male musicians
Academic staff of the Folkwang University of the Arts